Emoddi, also possibly called Pereudos, was a town of ancient Lydia, inhabited during Hellenistic and Roman times.

Its site is located near Topuzdamları in Asiatic Turkey.

References

Populated places in ancient Lydia
Former populated places in Turkey
Roman towns and cities in Turkey
History of Manisa Province